The CA-95 is a highly mobile, short range, Romanian native-made amphibious self-propelled anti-aircraft weapon, currently in service with the Romanian Land Forces. It can carry four infrared-guided surface to air missiles and has a range of approximately 700 km. Each TEL consists of two pairs of ready-to-fire missiles, mounted in boxes on either side of a turret on a TAB-79 amphibious vehicle. It can engage low-altitude targets located at maximum 4,200m height, but its most effectively engaged targets would be located at an altitude between 30 and 3,500 meters.

Gallery

See also
9K31 Strela-1
List of surface-to-air missiles

External links
CA-95's description on Romanian Ministry of Defense official website

Self-propelled anti-aircraft weapons
Armoured fighting vehicles of Romania